Treviso Foot Ball Club 1993, commonly known as Treviso, is an Italian football club based in Treviso, Veneto, which competes in Eccellenza, the fifth tier of Italian football.

Football Club Treviso was originally founded in 1909, while the current society dates back to 2021. The team has been playing its home matches in the 10,000-seat Stadio Omobono Tenni since 1933.

History

Foundation and early years 
The club was founded in 1909 as  Football Club Treviso and never played in the top flight of Italian football, always taking part in the lower national divisions, from Serie B to Serie D, with a sixth place in the 1950–51 Serie B table, under head coach Nereo Rocco, as its best result. In 1993 the club was shut down because of financial troubles.

1990s and 2000s: from amateur to Serie A 
In summer 1993 a new club was admitted to Serie D, as F.B.C. Treviso 1993. The club experienced a remarkable line of three consecutive promotions from 1994 to 1997 under coach Giuseppe Pillon which brought Treviso to Serie B, over 40 years after its last appearance in the second-highest Italian league. Treviso was relegated to Serie C1 in 2001, but returned to Serie B in 2003. In 2005, Pillon returned to Treviso and the team gained a respectable fifth place and a spot in the promotion playoffs but lost out to Perugia. However, in August 2005, after both Genoa and Torino were relegated out of Serie A, respectively for fraud and financial troubles, Treviso and Ascoli were arbitrarily promoted in Serie A as replacements.

In 2005–06, Treviso played in Italian Serie A for the first and, as so far, only time since its foundation. The team was coached by Ezio Rossi, then replaced by Alberto Cavasin. The team was initially forced to play their Serie A home games at the Stadio Euganeo, in the nearby city of Padua, because of the inadequacy of their home stadium, considered inadequate for Serie A matches owing both to security and capacity issues by the FIGC. However, a special legal dispensation was approved by the Italian parliament to allow Treviso to play at their home ground.

Treviso's Serie A stay was short-lived. In bottom place for nearly the entire 2005–06 season, they were officially relegated to Serie B for the '06–'07 campaign following a 3–1 loss to Messina on 9 April 2006. While it initially appeared that Treviso would avoid relegation despite finishing 20th as a result of forced relegations arising elsewhere as a consequence of the Serie A match-fixing scandal, Treviso were eventually relegated to Serie B on 25 July 2006 when S.S. Lazio and ACF Fiorentina's penalties were reduced by the Italian appeals court and those teams remained in Serie A. Back in Serie B Treviso started to face financial problems, with a net loss of €4.17 million in the 2006–07 season. The club had re-capitalized for over €7.5 million, but the net result was still €1.32 million in the 2007–08 season, with some notional selling profit for Dino Fava (who returned to Treviso for the same price, €900,000) and Massimo Coda (in a cash-plus player deal), as well as selling youth product Jacopo Fortunato and Riccardo Bocalon for €900,000 each in cash-plus-play deal (residual 50% rights of Alex Cordaz and Daniel Maa Boumsong (€1.05M in total). Financial irregularities also made FIGC penalize Treviso for 4 points in total, but 3 of them were removed by CONI. Furthermore, rising star Leonardo Bonucci left Treviso in January 2009 and the club lacked funds to reinforce the team since the start of 2008–09. The only deal that received cash from selling was Alessio Sestu (50% for €400,000).

The club ultimately went bankrupt in the summer of 2009, after it suffered relegation from Serie B that same year.

2009 refoundation 

A new club named A.S.D. Treviso 2009 was founded as a successor club, and was admitted to play in the Eccellenza Veneto which at the time was the 6th tier of Italian football, in the summer of 2009.

In the 2010–11 season, Treviso was promoted from Serie D group C to Lega Pro Seconda Divisione and was renamed Football Club Treviso. In the next it was promoted to Lega Pro Prima Divisione. In the 2012–13 season the club was relegated to Lega Pro Seconda Divisione, and then excluded again.

The club was successively refounded as A.C.D. Treviso in the summer 2013, restarting from Promozione.

The club achieved promotion to Eccellenza following the 2013–14 season, winning the promotion playoffs.

In 2021, the club changed its name to Treviso F.B.C. 1993 and was promoted to Eccellenza.

Colors and badge 
Treviso's official colours are light blue and white.

Honours 

Supercoppa di Lega Serie C1:
  Winners (1): 2003
Serie C1:
 Winners (2): 1996–07, 2002–03
Lega Pro Seconda Divisione:
 Winners (2): 1995–96 (As Serie C2), 2011–12
Serie D:
 Winners (3): 1974–75, 1994–95, 2010–11
Promozione Veneto:
 Winners (1): 2020–21
Coppa Italia Dilettanti:
  Winners (1): 1992–93

References

External links 
 Official website 

 
Football clubs in Italy
Football clubs in Veneto
Sport in Treviso
Association football clubs established in 1909
Italian football First Division clubs
Serie A clubs
Serie B clubs
Serie C clubs
Serie D clubs
Eccellenza
1909 establishments in Italy
Phoenix clubs (association football)
2009 establishments in Italy